Patushay (also known as Potshai) was initially an autonomic village in the Bandipora district of Jammu and Kashmir, India. Later on it was merged with Qazipora, and formed a new Village called Qazipora Patushi. It is 4 km away from Bandipora town, and 59 km away from Srinagar. The name Patushay is derived from the word Put, meaning Old, and Shay, meaning Place of history.

Notable Persons 
 Khazer Mohammad Parrey: KM Parrey was the famous and the only Contractor in the district in early 60's, he was commonly known as (Khazer Parrey / Lala). km Parrey constructed various projects in the district as well as in other district(s) like: Sopore-Bandipora Road, Kaloosa Bridge (old), Forest Training Institute Bandipora, Higher Secondary School Kaloosa and many other projects.
 Dr. Altaf Gauhar Haji was the first Oncology Surgeon in the Valley.
 Kousar Shafeeq: Vice-chairperson District Development Council Bandipora.

Educational Institutions 
There are various schools and educational institutions in this village, such as:
 Govt HKM Degree College Patushay
 Govt BMS Patushay
 Islamia Model School Patushay
 Krishi Vigyan Kendra Patushay

Demographics 
According to the 2011 census of India, Patushay has 1,114 households. The literacy rate of Patushay village was 62.40% compared to 67.16% of Jammu and Kashmir. In Patushay, male literacy stands at 71.00% while the female literacy rate was 53.09%.

Transport

Road 
Patushay is connected by road with other places in Jammu and Kashmir and India by the Srinagar-Bandipora Road, Sopore-Bandipora Road, etc.

Rail 
The nearest railway stations to Patushay are Sopore Railway Station and Srinagar Railway Station, located at a distance of 27 and 71 kilometres from Patushay respectively.

Air 
The nearest airport is Srinagar International Airport located at a distance of 67 km from Patushay.

Mosques and religious places 
Jamiyyah Mosques
 Marqazi Jamia Masjid Patushay
 Jamia Masjid Iqra (Formerly Malik Masjid) Patushay

Mosques (Non-Jamiyyah)
 Masjid Owais Karni
 Masjid Umar (Umar Colony)
 Masjid Rehmat (Degree College)
 Masjid Khazer (Planned: Parrey Mohalla)

Internet Service Providers 

 Jio Fiber (From April 2023) Book Now
 Airtel Xtreme Fiber (Soon) Book Now
 Net Plus Broadband (Soon) Book Now

See also 

 Bandipora
 Gurez Valley
 Wullar Lake
 Qazipora Patushi
 Harmukh
 Kashmir

References 

Villages in Bandipora district
Bandipora district